Psorergatidae is a family of parasitic mites in the order Prostigmata.

References 

Trombidiformes
Acari families